Central Mineira is one of the twelve mesoregions of the Brazilian state of Minas Gerais. It is composed of 30 municipalities, distributed across 3 microregions.

References 

Central Mineira